The Maskali Islands are located off the coast of Djibouti in the Gulf of Tadjoura. The islands are part of the Djibouti Region.

References

Islands of Djibouti